Swords Against the Shadowland is a fantasy novel by American writer Robin Wayne Bailey, featuring Fritz Leiber's sword and sorcery heroes Fafhrd and the Gray Mouser. It was first published as a trade paperback in August 1998 by White Wolf. A later trade paperback edition was issued by Dark Horse in April 2009. It was projected to be the first in a series of authorized continuations of the Fafhrd and Gray Mouser saga by Bailey. The second was reported to be "currently in progress" in 2008, but has yet to appear.

Plot
The Fafhrd and Gray Mouser stories follow the lives of two larcenous but likable rogues as they adventure across the fantasy world of Nehwon. In Swords Against the Shadowland, our two heroes return to Lankhmar, the city in which they met and in which their first loves, Ivrian and Vlanna, met their deaths. There, haunted by their lovers' ghosts, they combat a sorcerous plague cast on the city by a rogue wizard named Malygris.

Chronologically the story falls between the first and second volumes of the complete seven volume edition of Leiber's collected stories devoted to the characters. The story is a direct sequel to "Ill Met in Lankhmar", the last story in Swords and Deviltry, and covers some of the same events as "The Circle Curse", the first story in Swords Against Death.

Notes

External links
 Fantastic Fiction entry
 Dark Horse entry
 Review by Steve Silver

1998 American novels
Nehwon books
American fantasy novels